Aluf Yishai Beer (born 1956) is a former general in the Israel Defense Forces, head of a reserve call-up, and former president of the Israeli Military Court of Appeals.

He was drafted into the IDF in 1974 and joined the Paratroopers Brigade. Two years later he took part as a platoon leader in Operation Entebbe, freeing Israeli hostages flown to Uganda. He also participated in Operation Litani and as a reserve in the 1982 Lebanon War.  He rejoined the regular service in May 2002 when he was appointed to his current post, although as a doctor of law, he continues to work as a Law professor. During his career Beer received a B.A. from Hebrew University and an M.A. from the London School of Economics. In November 2008, Beer announced his retirement from the IDF.

Career and publications

Academic achievements
LL.B. (honors), Hebrew University, 1983; LL.M., London School of Economics, 1986; Ph.D., Hebrew University, 1990. Law clerk to Justice Dov Levin, Israel Supreme Court, 1983–95. Admitted to the Israel Bar Association, 1985. Lecturer in law, 1992; senior lecturer in law, 1994. Visiting scholar at Harvard Law School in 1990–92, and research fellow at New York University Stern School of Business in 1993. Academic awards include: the Argov Scholarship at the London School of Economics (1986); the Golda Meir Prize (1987), the Milken Prize for Outstanding Teaching (1990), and the Bloomfield Prize for the best Ph.D. thesis in the Social Sciences (1991) from the Hebrew University; and a research grant from the Israel Science Foundation – Israel Academy of Sciences and Humanities (1994–96). His research interests are taxation, especially of financial instruments.

Publications
Recent publications include:
"The Taxation of Interest Swaps and the Financial Service Charge: Toward a Consistent Approach," 1 Florida Tax Review (1994) pp. 729–743;
"Taxation of Non-Profit Organisations: Towards Efficient Tax Rules," British Tax Review (1995) pp. 156–172;
"Taxation of Complex Transactions: Do Not Ignore the Options," 29 Mishpatim (1998) pp. 213–239 (in Hebrew).

References

External links
 Bio from IDF
 Home page, Faculty of Law, The Hebrew University of Jerusalem

Living people
Israeli generals
Hebrew University of Jerusalem Faculty of Law alumni
Alumni of the London School of Economics
Harvard Law School faculty
1956 births